Wincanton Racecourse is a thoroughbred horse racing venue located in Wincanton, Somerset, England.

The steeplechase fences are large, making it a good test of a chaser. Three fences in quick succession in the second half of the home-straight make for exciting racing and often change the complexion of a finish dramatically; resulting in a great many close finishes.

The track stages several big races, including the Kingwell Hurdle in February. The CGA Chase (previously the Jim Ford Challenge Cup, last run in 2012) was run on the same day; these races were significant trials for the Champion Hurdle and Cheltenham Gold Cup respectively. Several of the races at the course were shown on Channel 4 and are now occasionally shown on ITV.

The track is located near to the yard of the trainer, Paul Nicholls and as such many of his young horses run here.

Notable races

References

External links
Wincanton Racecourse (Official website)

 
Sports venues in Somerset
Horse racing venues in England
Wincanton